American Chemistry Council (ACC), formerly known as the Manufacturing Chemists' Association (at its founding in 1872) and then as the Chemical Manufacturers' Association (from 1978 until 2000), is an industry trade association for American chemical companies, based in Washington, D.C.

Activities
The mission of the American Chemistry Council is to promote the interests of corporations of the chemical industry. The trade group represents US chemical companies as well as the plastics and chlorine industries, formerly known as the American Plastics Council, the Center for the Polyurethanes Industry and the Chlorine Chemistry Council.

ACC implemented the Responsible Care program in 1988. At least 52 countries have implemented this initiative. It is managed at a global level by the International Council of Chemical Associations.

ACC has a political action committee that gives money to members of the Congress of the United States.

ACC launched a $35 million "essential2" public relations campaign in 2005. "essential2" attempted to improve the industry's image by emphasizing the importance of chemical industry products – especially plastics – to everyday life, and by using the term "American Chemistry" rather than "chemical industry". ACC later shifted to a more directed lobbying and policy-shaping effort, including taking legal action against federal efforts to regulate greenhouse gas emissions from industry.

Sometime in 2008, ACC launched a campaign to oppose California SB1713 – a bill to ban bisphenol A statewide – including bulk postal mailings in July and August encouraging California citizens to demand opposition of their representing legislators.

In 2011, ACC was a major sponsor of the 5th International Marine Debris Conference which endorsed the Honolulu Commitment to reduce harmful plastics in the environment

Criticism
Some critics believe that the Responsible Care program is intended to help the industry avoid regulation by imposing its own safety and environmental regulations, and to improve its public image in the wake of the 1984 Bhopal disaster.  Defenders of the Responsible Care standard claim the program has improved safety and that its standards are higher than some OSHA regulations.

Environmentalists and those concerned about the health effects of chemicals in the environment traditionally oppose ACC's initiatives.  They view campaigns like "essential2" as efforts to distract public attention away from products and practices that they view as harmful and dangerous. 

The American Chemistry Council's stance on chemical regulation was heavily criticized in the 2015 documentary Stink!.

Plastic bag regulation
ACC has engaged repeatedly in fighting governmental restrictions and bans on plastic shopping bags. The phase-out of lightweight plastic bags has been proposed or implemented in many countries since 2002. In the United States, in July 2008, the Seattle City Council voted to impose an additional 20 cent fee on each plastic bag purchased from stores by shoppers as a convenience for transportation of goods. This effort was suspended until a referendum could be held in 2009, allowing voters a chance to weigh in on the issue of whether they should continue to be encouraged to support industry by purchasing plastic bags without considering disposal costs. During the period leading up to the referendum vote the American Chemistry Council stepped into this local affair, ultimately spending some $1.4 million on their successful effort to thwart the proposed system of fully accounting for the cost of plastic bags. Seattle in 2012 overcame ACC objections and successfully enacted a bag ban.

In 2010, ACC was quoted by The New York Times in opposition to a California bill to outlaw plastic bags, claiming that new law "amounts to a $1 billion tax added to [Californian's] grocery bills."

But subsequent ACC efforts to prevent adoption of municipal ordinances banning plastic bags have not been successful. Over ACC opposition, San Jose, California, in 2010 adopted California's strictest ban. The ordinance, in effect since 2012, prohibits supermarkets, pharmacies, corner shops and others from distributing single-use plastic bags, with fines for violations. Retailers can sell paper bags made of 40 percent recycled materials for 10 cents each, gradually increasing to 25 cents by 2014. In 2016, California voters approved a statewide ban on carry-out plastic bags.

See also
 American Council on Science and Health
 American Chemical Society

References

External links
 AmericanChemistry.com (official website)
 PlasticsMythBuster.org (another American Chemistry Council site)
 BisphenolA (another site owned by American Chemistry Council)
 Responsible Care Global Initiative
 Lobby Watch: The Center for Public Integrity ACC profile
 American Chemistry Council Political Contributions, Lobbying and Outside Spending - Opensecrets.org
 

Business organizations based in the United States
Chemistry trade associations
Organizations based in Arlington County, Virginia
1872 establishments in the United States
Scientific organizations established in 1872